The Moscow Hemp Fest (sometimes Moscow Hempfest) is an annual cannabis event held in Moscow, Idaho. It began in 1996 as a part of the University of Idaho's Mom's Weekend.

See also
 Cannabis in Idaho

References

External links

 

1996 establishments in Idaho
1996 in cannabis
Annual events in Idaho
Cannabis events in the United States
Cannabis in Idaho
Festivals in Idaho
Moscow, Idaho
Recurring events established in 1996